Newcastle upon Tyne East and Wallsend was, from 1997 until 2010, a constituency represented in the House of Commons of the Parliament of the United Kingdom. It elected one Member of Parliament (MP) by the first past the post system of election.

History
The constituency was created in 1997 by the merger of the bulk of the former seat of Newcastle upon Tyne East and parts of the former seat of Wallsend. 

It was represented throughout its existence by Nick Brown of the Labour Party, who served as Government Chief Whip from 1997 to 1998 and again from 2008 to 2010.

Boundaries

 the City of Newcastle upon Tyne wards of Byker, Dene, Heaton, Monkchester, Walker, and Walkergate; and
 the Borough of North Tyneside wards of Northumberland and Wallsend.

As would be inferred from the name, the constituency consisted of the eastern parts of the City of Newcastle upon Tyne plus Wallsend and the surrounding area.

Following their review of parliamentary representation in Tyne and Wear, reducing the number of seats in the county from 13 to 12, the Boundary Commission for England revived the constituency of Newcastle upon Tyne East in 2010. The Wallsend area was transferred to the adjacent North Tyneside constituency.

Members of Parliament

Elections

Elections of the 2000s

Elections of the 1990s

See also
History of parliamentary constituencies and boundaries in Tyne and Wear

Notes and references

Parliamentary constituencies in Tyne and Wear (historic)
Constituencies of the Parliament of the United Kingdom established in 1997
Constituencies of the Parliament of the United Kingdom disestablished in 2010
Politics of Newcastle upon Tyne
Metropolitan Borough of North Tyneside